Lielirbe (Livonian: Īra) is a populated place in Tārgale parish, Ventspils municipality, Latvia. One of the twelve Livonian villages on Līvõd rānda - the Livonian Coast. Lielirbe is also known as Liyelirbe, Gross Irben, and Lielirbes Ciems.

Notable people  
Born in Lielirbe: 
Mārtiņš Lepste (Livonian:  Maŗt Lepst ) (1881-1958) — Livonian sailor and teacher on the Liv coast in 1923–1938, chairman of the Livonian Union in 1924–1933.
Didriķis Blūms (1893-1970) — conductor of Lielirbe choir. 
Emīlija Rulle (1910-1989) — a poet. 
Valda Blūma-Šuvcāne (1923-2007) — researcher of the Livonian culture and history.

References

See also
Livonian people

Towns and villages in Latvia
Ventspils Municipality